Round Rock Multipurpose Complex is a multi-sports complex in Round Rock, Texas, United States and was the home of the Austin Elite of Major League Rugby.

Austin Gilgronis
Major League Rugby stadiums
Round Rock, Texas
Rugby union stadiums in Texas
Soccer venues in Texas